Camile is an Irish restaurant chain, serving Thai cuisine. Originating in Dolphin's Barn, Dublin in 2010, the chain was co-founded by Brody Sweeney (previously associated with the O'Briens Irish Sandwich Bars chain). The chain, which operates via a franchise restaurant model, has since expanded throughout Ireland and the UK, with 45 locations as of 2021. As of June 2021, it was also reportedly expanding via a "partnership" model in the United States.

See also
 List of restaurant chains in Ireland
 List of Thai restaurants

References 

Fast-food chains of Ireland
Thai restaurants